The 29th Rhythmic Gymnastics European Championships took place from May 31 to June 2, 2013 at the Wiener Stadthalle in Vienna, Austria including 34 National Federations.

Medal winners

Results

Seniors

Team

Hoop

Ball 
Kudryavtseva became the first rhythmic gymnast to score a 19 points (19.000) under the new 2013-16 Code of Points.

Clubs

Ribbon

Juniors

Group All-around

Group: 5 hoops

Medal count

Seniors

Juniors

References

External links

UEG Site
 Rhythmic Gymnastics Results

2013 in gymnastics
2013
2013 in Austrian sport
International gymnastics competitions hosted by Austria